Married at First Sight is a British television programme where couples are matched "scientifically" by a panel of "experts". They meet just minutes before they marry. Upon returning, they live together for a period of time, during which they meet at commitment ceremonies and choose whether or not they will continue their relationship. On 14 March 2021, Owen and Michelle from Series 5 became the first couple to celebrate their 1st wedding anniversary together.

On 24 November 2020, it was announced that the programme will move to Channel 4's sister channel E4 in 2021 and will use the format of its Australian counterpart following the highly successful broadcast of the latter on E4.

Following the success of Series 6, it has been recommissioned for a longer 30-episode seventh series.

Series 1 (2015)
First aired in July 2015. The couples were:

Series 2 (2016)
First aired in October and November 2016. The couples were:

Series 3 (2018)
First aired in February and March 2018. The couples were:

Series 4 (2019)
First aired in March and April 2019. The couples were:

Series 5 (2020)
First aired in October 2020. The couples were:

Series 6 (2021)
After the success of the Australian version, the Australian format was adopted. In Episode 1, two couples (Bob & Megan and Ant & Nikita) were matched and married. In Episode 2, two couples (Matt & Dan and Luke & Morag) were matched and married. In Episode 4, two couples (Josh & Amy and Franky & Marilyse) met and were married. In Episode 5, the final two couples (Adam & Tayah and Jordon & Alexis) met and were married.

This series began on 30 August 2021. The final scheduled for 30 September 2021 was postponed after technical problems prevented it from being shown. The final episode was rescheduled the following day.

Ceremony history

  This couple left the experiment outside of commitment ceremony.
  This couple elected to leave the experiment during the commitment ceremony.
  This couple was removed from the experiment by the experts or Production.

Couple profiles

Viewing figures 
Official, 28-day consolidated ratings are taken from BARB and include E4 +1. Catch-up service totals are added to the official ratings.

"Afters" specials 
For this series, a special aftershow was broadcast on Thursdays at 10pm, after the final Married at First Sight episode of the week.

Series 7 (2022)
After the success of the sixth series, an extended thirty-episode version using the same format was commissioned. This time, the cast included two same-sex couples - one male and one female. In each of Episodes 1, 2, 4 & 5, two couples were matched and married. In a franchise first, two additional couples were married and joined the experiment in Episode 12. The series began on August 29th, 2022, with the first episode followed by a "One Year Later" special episode with some of Series 6's cast. For this series, the Dinner Parties and Commitment Ceremonies moved from Brighton to Trinity Quay Wharf in London's Docklands.

Ceremony history

  This couple left the experiment outside of commitment ceremony.
  This couple elected to leave the experiment during the commitment ceremony.
  This couple was removed from the experiment by the experts or Production.

Couple profiles

Viewing figures 
Official, 7-day consolidated ratings are taken from Thinkbox and include E4 +1. From this series, 28-day ratings with viewership on devices other than televisions are no longer available, and so cannot be directly compared with the previous series.

A "One Year On" special, broadcast after the first episode on August 29, consolidated to 729,000 viewers.

"Unveiled" specials 
"Married at First Sight UK: Afters" returned for Series 7 - now rebranded as "Unveiled".

See also
Married at First Sight (American TV series)
Married at First Sight (Australian TV series)

References

Channel 4 reality television shows
E4 reality television shows
British dating and relationship reality television series
British television series based on non-British television series
English-language television shows
2010s British reality television series
2020s British reality television series
2015 British television series debuts
Wedding television shows